The 2010–11 Oman First Division League (known as the Omantel First Division League for sponsorship reasons) is the 35th edition of the second-highest division overall football league in Oman. The season began on 3 November 2010 and concluded on 21 April 2011. Ahli Sidab Club were the defending champions, having won their first title in the previous 2009–10 season.

Group stage

Group A

Group B

Semifinals
4 teams played a knockout tie. 2 ties were played over two legs. The first match was played between Majees SC and Sur SC on 8 April 2011.

1st Legs

2nd Legs

3/4th Place match

Finals

Promotion/relegation play-off

1st Leg

2nd Leg

''Fanja secured promotion after winning by away goals rule (2-2).

References

Oman First Division League seasons
Oman
2010–11 in Omani football